Fantastic Films is an Irish film production company based in Dublin, Ireland run by producers John McDonnell & Brendan McCarthy.

Filmography
Vivarium (producer, 2019)
The Last Days on Mars (co-producer, 2012)
The Summit (executive producer, 2012)
'Stitches (2012 film) (producer, 2012)Ek Tha Tiger (executive producer, 2012)Wake Wood (producer, 2011)
 Songs For Amy (executive producer, 2011)Outcast (producer, 2010)Pelican Blood (producer, 2009)Zonad (producer, 2008)48 Angels (producer, 2007)Tiger's Tail (co-producer, 2006)Wilderness (film) (producer, 2005)Timbuktu (producer, 2004)Song for a Raggy Boy'' (producer, 2003)

External links
 Official Site

References

Fantastic Films films
Film production companies of Ireland